John F. Schlosser (August 22, 1839-?) was a Republican member of the New York State Senate from the 26th district who was born in the city of Poughkeepsie, New York. After graduating from Union College, Schlosser went to Fishkill Landing in Duchess County, opened a law office, and actively practiced law. He was succeeded by future president Franklin D. Roosevelt.

References 

1839 births
Year of death missing
Politicians from Poughkeepsie, New York
Place of death missing
Republican Party New York (state) state senators
Union College (New York) alumni
New York (state) lawyers